Rao Abdus Sattar is a Pakistani politician who serves as the Senator from Sahiwal, Pakistan, in office since 1973.

References

Leaders of the House for the Senate of Pakistan
Politicians from Sahiwal
Possibly living people
Year of birth missing